The 1941 Harrow by-election was held on 2 December 1941.  The by-election was held due to the death of the incumbent Conservative MP, Isidore Salmon.  It was won by the Conservative candidate Norman Bower. By the time of the by-election, Harrow's electorate had more than quadrupled since 1924, and stood at 168,594 voters in 1941.

References

Harrow by-election
Harrow,1941
Harrow by-election
Harrow,1941
20th century in Middlesex